Tangen Upper Secondary School is a public school in Kristiansand, Norway. It has around 1200  students and 250 employees.

See also
Kvadraturen skolesenter
Education in Norway

References

Education in Agder
Kristiansand
Educational institutions established in 2009
2009 establishments in Norway
Secondary schools in Norway